Alfie Arcuri is an Australian singer-songwriter best known for winning the fifth season of The Voice Australia in 2016. He signed with Universal Music Australia. His debut studio album Zenith was released in July 2016 and peaked at number 5 on the ARIA Charts.

Early life
Arcuri was born to an Italian family and grew up in Camden, New South Wales. He is a qualified architect, working at Mosca Pserras Architects until 2014. He told his family he was gay in 2013, when he was 24 years old.

Career

2016–2018: The Voice and Zenith

In 2016 Arcuri took part in the fifth season of The Voice Australia, where he joined Delta Goodrem's team, and was the first auditionee. He made it through to the Grand Finale and on 10 July, he was announced as the winner.

 denotes having been in the bottom four.
 denotes winner.

Arcuri released his debut single "Cruel" immediately after. The song peaked at number 89 selling 1, 458 in its first week, becoming the show's worst performing winners single to date. Arcuri's debut album Zenith was released on 29 July 2016 and peaked at number 5 on the ARIA Charts. In November, Arcuri talked about "Cruel" and its lack of success to River 949: "I love the song and it sounds so good acoustically. But I sort of had a feeling it wasn't going to do too well because I guess people on the show connected with me for certain songs and I was a ballad guy, and then I come out with this song which is a bit different. People would have connected more with a ballad but that's what I'm doing now anyway, I'm coming out with that. And that was the right way it was meant to happen." Arcuri commenced his first national tour across Australia in November 2016.

In May 2017, Arcuri released "If They Only Knew". It is a song Arcuri co-wrote, saying “When you feel heartbreak for the very first time, it’s the most extreme emotion, other than being in love. I can't explain how it makes me feel that I've written it and hopefully people will connect to it the way I have.”

In October 2017, Arcuri released "Love Is Love", a song in support of the "Yes" vote of the Australian Marriage Law Postal Survey. Arcuri told DNA magazine: "I wrote it for myself, my friends and the community... There has been a bit of propaganda floating around and some of my friends were feeling a bit defeated, so I wanted to write an uplifting anthem. Music has always been my escape and writing this song was very therapeutic."

2019–present: Australia Decides, Golden Stag Festival & Una voce per San Marino
On 18 January, Arcuri released "To Myself"; a song named as an entry in the running to represent Australia at the Eurovision Song Contest 2019. In February, Arcuri performed the song at the final of Eurovision - Australia Decides, placing 5th out of 10 performers.

In August 2019, Arcuri represented Australia at the Golden Stag Festival (Romanian: Cerbul de Aur), winning the prize for the best interpretation of a Romanian song.

In February 2023, Arcuri entered Una voce per San Marino in an attempt to represent San Marino at the Eurovision Song Contest 2023 with "Collide". He qualified for the final. In the same month, Arcuri announced the release of his debut EP, L.D.D. (Love is a Dangerous Drug).

Discography

Studio albums

Extended plays

Singles

References

External links 

 

1988 births
Living people
The Voice (Australian TV series) contestants
The Voice (franchise) winners
Australian gay musicians
Australian LGBT singers
Gay singers
People from New South Wales
Arcuri, Alfie
Australian people of Italian descent
21st-century Australian singers
20th-century Australian LGBT people
21st-century Australian LGBT people